The 2019–20 NCAA Division III men's ice hockey season began on November 1, 2019, and concluded on March 8, 2020. This was the 47th season of Division III college ice hockey.

Two days before the National Tournament was set to begin, the championship, along with all other NCAA events for the spring semester, was cancelled due to the Coronavirus outbreak.

Regular season
The Commonwealth Coast Conference, following the general trend of other conferences, altered its standings away from the traditional win–loss–tie format. Three points were now awarded for a win, one point for a tie and no points for a loss. The new method used was a convoluted arrangement where a team's conference record would still be recorded based upon the standard NCAA format where wins and losses accrued in the 5-minute 5-on-5 overtime were included in the win column. However, the CCC tracked overtime wins and losses so that if a team won a game in overtime they would receive two points instead of the normal three while if a team lost an overtime game they would receive a point. Teams that recorded a tie would follow a more typical situation where they would receive one additional point for a 3-on-3 overtime win or a shootout win but would not receive any additional points for a loss in either case.

The formula for the points standings were as follows: Points = (wins x 3) + (ties) – (5-on-5 overtime wins) + (5-on-5 overtime losses) + (3-on-3 overtime wins) + (shootout wins)

Season tournaments

Standings

Note: Mini-game are not included in final standings

2020 NCAA Tournament

See also
 2019–20 NCAA Division I men's ice hockey season
 2019–20 NCAA Division II men's ice hockey season

References

External links

 
NCAA